Main Hall/La Crosse State Normal School was the original building for La Crosse Normal School now the University of Wisconsin–La Crosse in La Crosse, Wisconsin. The building was constructed in 1909. The office of the chancellor and various administrative departments are in Main Hall. The building is now known as the Maurice O. Graff Main Hall.

References

University and college buildings on the National Register of Historic Places in Wisconsin
Buildings and structures in La Crosse, Wisconsin
University of Wisconsin–La Crosse
University and college administration buildings in the United States
National Register of Historic Places in La Crosse County, Wisconsin